Glasgow South West is a constituency of the House of Commons of the Parliament of the United Kingdom. As in all other seats since the 1950 abolition of multi-member university returns to the Commons, residents elect one Member of Parliament (MP) by the first past the post system of election.
 
The seat saw its first MP at the 2005 general election. Its 2017 general election result was the ninth-closest result, with a winning margin of 60 votes.

At the 2019 general election, Chris Stephens of the SNP was re-elected with an increased majority over Matt Kerr of the Labour Party, with 4,900 votes and a 7.2% swing from the previous election two years earlier.

Boundaries

The Glasgow City wards of Cardonald, Crookston, Darnley, Drumoyne, Govan, Ibrox, Mosspark, Nitshill, North Cardonald, Penilee, and Pollok.

The seat is one of seven covering the Glasgow City council area; none have overspill.

Before the 2005 general election the city was covered by ten constituencies, of which two straddled boundaries with other council areas. The area's representatives before its inception were those for Glasgow Pollok and to a lesser extent Glasgow Govan.

Scottish Parliament constituencies retain the names and boundaries of the immediate forebear seats.

Members of Parliament

Election results

Elections in the 2010s

Elections in the 2000s

See also 
 Politics of Glasgow

References 

♯ This reference gives all recent Glasgow City Westminster election results. You select the year and then the constituency to view the result.

Westminster Parliamentary constituencies in Scotland
Constituencies of the Parliament of the United Kingdom established in 2005
Politics of Glasgow
Govan